Didymosalpinx is a genus of flowering plants in the family Rubiaceae. The genus is found in tropical Africa.

Species 
 Didymosalpinx abbeokutae (Hiern) Keay
 Didymosalpinx callianthus J.E.Burrows & S.M.Burrows
 Didymosalpinx konguensis (Hiern) Keay
 Didymosalpinx lanciloba (S.Moore) Keay
 Didymosalpinx norae (Swynn.) Keay

References

External links 
 Didymosalpinx in the World Checklist of Rubiaceae

Rubiaceae genera
Gardenieae
Flora of Africa
Taxa named by Ronald William John Keay